Choe Ui (1233 – 1258) (최의) was the fourth and last Choe dictator of the Ubong Choe Military regime.

Biography

When he was born in 1233, his father was a monk. In 1257, Choe Ui became military leader of Goryeo after his father's death. He was beautiful in appearance, quiet and shy, but in other sources, Choe Ui was described as cowardly and obese. He learned poetry and writing. The Choe regime ended, after Choe Ui was assassinated by Kim Jun in order to take the power. His ancestors were all trained in the martial arts, but Choe Ui did not, probably because by then, the Choe family was very wealthy, and no fighting on the battlefields was necessary.

Choe Ui was the last of the Choe rulers that lasted 60 years, during which Goryeo could resist the Mongol invasions. In 1258, Kim Jun overthrew him. Other accounts claim that some troops were trying to push the heavy tyrant over the wall but were killed before they could do so because he was so fat. After the fall of the Choe military regime, the Sambyeolcho, the private army of the Choe family, separated from the Goryeo government and attempted to start its nation. Still, this rebellion was defeated by a Mongol-Goryeo army.

Family
Father: Choe Hang (1209 – 17 May 1257) (최항)
Grandfather: Choe U (1166 - 10 December 1249) (최우)
Grandmother: Seo Ryeon-bang (서련방)
Mother: Unnamed concubine
Wives:
Lady, of the Inju Yi clan (부인 인주 이씨) – No issue.
Lady Sim Gyeong (심경) – No issue.

In popular culture
 Portrayed by Baek Jong-Min in the 2012 MBC TV series God of War.

References

External links
 

13th-century Korean people
Choe clan of Ubong
1233 births
1258 deaths

Regents of Korea
Executed Korean people
Leaders ousted by a coup